Sidney Bradshaw Fay (13 April 1876 in Washington, D.C. – 29 August 1967 in Lexington, Massachusetts) was an American historian, whose examination of the causes of World War I, The Origins of the World War  (1928; revised edition 1930) remains a classic study. In this book, which won him the 1928 George Louis Beer Prize of the American Historical Association, Fay argued that Germany was too readily blamed for the war and that a great deal of the responsibility instead rested with the Allies, especially Russia and Serbia. His stance is supported by several modern scholars, such as Christopher Clark, but it remains controversial.

Fay left Harvard University (Ph.D. 1900) to study at the Sorbonne and the University of Berlin. He taught at Dartmouth College (1902–14) and Smith College (1914–29) and, after the publication of his major book, at both Harvard and Yale University.

Fay's conclusion was that all the European powers shared in the blame, but he blamed mostly the system of secret alliances that divided Europe after the Franco-Prussian War into two mutually suspicious camps of group solidarity: Triple Alliance against Triple Entente (Fay's student Allan B. Calhamer, would later develop and publish the game Diplomacy, based on this thesis). He considered Austro-Hungary, Serbia and Russia to be primarily responsible for the immediate cause of war's outbreak. Other forces besides militarism and nationalism were at work, as the economics of imperialism and the newspaper press played roles.

Fay was elected to the American Academy of Arts and Sciences in 1931 and the American Philosophical Society in 1947.

Fay also wrote The Rise of Brandenburg-Prussia to 1786 (1937).

He married (17 August 1904) Sarah Eliza Proctor.

Works
 Germany: Revised and Edited from the Work of Bayard Taylor, H. W. Snow, c. 1910 [P. F. Collier & Son Corporation, c. 1939, "Memorial edition"].
 The Hohenzollern Household and Administration in the Sixteenth Century, with John Spencer Bassett, Dept. of History of Smith College, 1916.
 The Origins of the World War, 2 Vols., The Macmillan Company, 1928 [2d ed., 1930]. online
 The Rise of Brandenburg-Prussia to 1786,, H. Holt and Company, c. 1937 [Reprint, Malabar, Fla.: R.E. Krieger Pub. Co., 1981].
 A Guide to Historical Literature,, edited by George Matthew Dutcher, Henry Robinson Shipman, Sidney Bradshaw Fay, Augustus Hunt Shearer, William Henry Allison, The Macmillan Company, 1937.

Other
 Eduard Fueter (1876–1928), World History, 1815–1920, Harcourt, Brace and Company, 1921, Zurich [translated by Sidney Fay, 1922].
 Friedrich Meinecke, The German Catastrophe, Harvard University Press, 1950 [translated by Sidney Fay].

Articles
 "The Roman Law and the German Peasant," The American Historical Review, Vol. 16, No. 2, Jan., 1911.
 "New Light on the Origins of the World War, I. Berlin and Vienna, to July 29," The American Historical Review, Vol. 25, No. 4, Jul., 1920.
 "Serajevo Fifteen Years After," The Living Age, July 1929.
 "June 28, 1914," in Eugene Lohrke, Armageddon, 1930.
 "Peace-Making: 1919, 1945," The Forum, November 1945.
 "Our Responsibility for German Universities," The Forum, January 1946.
 "The First U.N.O. Assembly," The Forum, April 1946.
 "The Power of the Soviet Press," The Forum, August 1947.
 "The Marshall Plan: Second Phase," The Forum, February 1948.
 "Germany's Social Structure," The Forum, October 1948.

See also 
Causes of World War I

References

Further reading
 Bender, Wilbur J. "Sidney Bradshaw Fay," Proceedings of the Massachusetts Historical Society, Third Series, Vol. 79, 1967. in JSTOR
 Schmitt, Bernadotte E. "Sidney Bradshaw Fay, 1876–1967," Central European History, Vol. 1, No. 2, Jun., 1968.

External links 
Bibliography of Sidney Bradshaw Fay

American historians
Harvard University alumni
University of Paris alumni
Dartmouth College faculty
Smith College faculty
Harvard University faculty
Yale University faculty
Presidents of the American Historical Association
1876 births
1967 deaths
American expatriates in France
American expatriates in Germany
Members of the American Philosophical Society